Chicago Now Vol. 2 is an album by American jazz saxophonist Ernest Dawkins' New Horizons Ensemble, which was recorded in 1994 and released on the Swedish Silkheart label.

Reception

In his review for AllMusic, Scott Yanow states "It is obvious that these six musicians had spent a lot of time playing together because they react quickly to each other, share the lead, and often speak as in one voice. A superior and well-played set that should even interest jazz listeners who claim to not enjoy the avant-garde."

Track listing
All compositions by Ernest Dawkins except as indicated
 "Monk's Temptation" – 10:58
 "Runnin' from the Rain (alt)" – 9:35
 "Planet East" – 10:38
 "Zera (alt)" – 12:56
 "Improvisations #3" – 11:04
 "Looking for Ninny" (Ameen Muhammad) – 4:34
 "Many Favors" – 13:04

Personnel
Ernest Dawkins – alto sax, tenor sax, flute, percussion, vocal
Steve Berry – trombone, percussion
Ameen Muhammad - trumpet, percussion, vocal
Jeff Parker – electric guitar
Yosef Ben Israel – bass
Reggie Nicholson - drums, percussion

References

1997 albums
Ernest Dawkins albums
Silkheart Records albums